Yasser Abubakar (Arabic:ياسر أبو بكر) (born 10 January 1992) is a Qatari footballer. He currently plays for Al Ahli.

External links

References

Qatari footballers
1992 births
Living people
El Jaish SC players
Al-Sailiya SC players
Al Sadd SC players
Al-Arabi SC (Qatar) players
Al Ahli SC (Doha) players
Qatar Stars League players
Qatari Second Division players
Association football fullbacks